Austrocidaria cedrinodes is a species of moth of the family Geometridae. It endemic to New Zealand.

References

Xanthorhoini
Moths of New Zealand
Moths described in 1911
Endemic fauna of New Zealand
Taxa named by Edward Meyrick
Endemic moths of New Zealand